Gage Park is a city park of  in Topeka, Kansas, United States. It was established in 1899 and is one of the largest parks in Topeka. It features the Topeka Zoo, the Kansas Children's Discovery Center, a miniature train of  gauge, the Helen Hocker Theater, the Blaisdell family aquatic center, and the Reinisch Rose Garden. The 70-year-old rose garden is a popular place for weddings and events, and also a place where serious horticultural work is done.

History 
Gage Park was established in 1899 when the heirs of Guilford Gage donated their farm to the city of Topeka as a recreational center. George Kessler prepared the first plan between 1899 and 1901, city horticulturist Anton Reinisch continuing the work. The zoo and Doran Rock Garden were both constructed in the 1930s. Animaland followed in 1960 – a playground with concrete animals for climbing. 

Fred Phelps and the Westboro Baptist Church began their anti-gay crusade in 1991 with what they called "The Great Gage Park Decency Drive", seeking a crack down on homosexuals allegedly cruising for sex in the park.  At the time, the church circulated a flyer, "Gage Park Sodomite Rats Nest".

In popular culture
Gage Park was featured in the beginning of the 1997 Stephen King novel The Dark Tower IV: Wizard and Glass, with Reinisch garden, the zoo, and the train being mentioned. In the book, the city of Topeka is deserted due to the influenza of King's novel The Stand."But in your time, Charlie-boy, you pulled your share of kids, right? Around and around Gage Park you went, and the kids laughed, except some of them weren't really laughing; some of them, the ones who were wise to you, were screaming."

References

External links
 Rose Garden History

Geography of Topeka, Kansas
Parks in Kansas
Tourist attractions in Topeka, Kansas
Protected areas of Shawnee County, Kansas
Protected areas established in 1899
1899 establishments in Kansas